XHUNL-FM is a radio station serving Monterrey, Nuevo León, located in San Nicolás de los Garza. Owned by the Universidad Autónoma de Nuevo León, XHUNL-FM broadcasts on 89.7 FM from studios and a transmitter on the UANL campus.

It is a sister station to XHMNU-TDT digital 35.

References

External links

Radio stations in Monterrey
University radio stations in Mexico